Marcos Marin (September 12, 1967), is a Brazilian artist living in Monaco.

Biography 
Born and raised in São Paulo, Marin initially pursued a career as a pianist. Marin came to France to study music in Angers. Marin came into contact with Victor Vasarely while working as an assistant to a printmaker in Montmartre, He met gallerist Delphine Pastor at Art Basel in 2004. He exhibited a portrait of Grace Kelly at her gallery that was acquired by the New National Museum of Monaco. The portrait was later installed at Princess Grace Hospital in December 2020.

In 2007, under the patronage of Pierre Cardin, he took up a residency at Château de Lacoste. His first project was a series of portraits of classical musicians for Pierre Cardin's Festival de Lacoste.

In 2019 Marin's sculpture of Neymar was unveiled in Paris.

References

External links
 Official website 
 Instagram
 Interview
 Marcos Marin
 A arte de Marcos Marin em Mônaco

1967 births
Brazilian contemporary artists
Brazilian people of Spanish descent
American people of Lebanese descent
Artists from New York (state)
Postmodern artists
Experiments in Art and Technology collaborating artists
Living people